Tolsteeg is a neighbourhood in the south of the Dutch city of Utrecht.

Tolsteeg was a separate municipality between 1818 and 1823, when it was merged with Utrecht.

References

Former municipalities of Utrecht (province)